Ringkøbing Landbobank is a bank headquartered in Ringkøbing, Denmark. It was founded in 1886. 

The bank currently (late 2017) has a share buyback programme.

It was the most popular bank in Denmark based on customer reviews in 2018, ending a nine-year stretch by the Arbejdernes Landsbank.

Building
The head office is at Torvet 1 in Ringkøbing.

Mergers and acquisition history

References

External links
 Official website
 Bank Profile: Ringkøbing Landbobank

Banks of Denmark
Banks established in 1886
Danish companies established in 1886